Taurasia is a genus of sea snails, marine gastropod mollusks in the subfamily Rapaninae of the family Muricidae, the murex snails or rock snails.

Species
Species within the genus Taurasia include:
 † Taurasia coronata Bellardi, 1882 
 † Taurasia heteroclita (Grateloup, 1845) 
 † Taurasia nodosa Bellardi, 1882 
 † Taurasia pleurotoma (Grateloup, 1832) 
 Taurasia striata (Quoy & Gaimard, 1833 )
 † Taurasia subfusiformis (d'Orbigny, 1852) 
Synonyms
 † Taurasia niasensis Beets, 1985: synonym of † Taurasia striata (Blainville, 1832)
 † Taurasia pendopoensis Beets, 1985: synonym of † Preangeria praeundosa (Vredenburg, 1924)

References

 Claremont M., Vermeij G.J., Williams S.T. & Reid D.G. (2013) Global phylogeny and new classification of the Rapaninae (Gastropoda: Muricidae), dominant molluscan predators on tropical rocky seashores. Molecular Phylogenetics and Evolution 66: 91–102.
 Raven, J.G.M. (H.). (2016). Notes on molluscs from NW Borneo. 3. A revision of Taurasia (Gastropoda, Muricidae) and Preangeria (Gastropoda, Buccinidae) with comments on Semiricinula from NW Borneo. Vita Malacologica. 15: 77-104.

External links
 Bellardi, L. (1882). I molluschi dei terreni terziarii del Piemonte e della Liguria. Parte III. Gasteropoda (Buccinidae, Cyclopsidae, Purpuridae, Coralliophilidae, Olividae). Ermanno Loescher, Roma, Torino, Firenze; 253 pp., 12 pl

 
Rapaninae